In 'n Out is the third album by the jazz saxophonist Joe Henderson, released on the Blue Note label. It was recorded on April 10, 1964, and contains performances by Henderson with trumpeter Kenny Dorham, pianist McCoy Tyner, bassist Richard Davis and drummer Elvin Jones.

Reception

The AllMusic review by Scott Yanow states that Henderson "has always had the ability to make a routine bop piece sound complex and the most complicated free improvisation seem logical... the music still seems fresh after three decades." The Penguin Guide to Jazz states that "while in general the temperature seems rather lower than on Henderson's other Blue Notes, it's fascinating, profound music."

Track listing
All compositions by Joe Henderson except where noted.

 "In 'N Out" – 10:23
 "Punjab" – 9:07
 "Serenity" – 6:16
 "Short Story" (Dorham) – 7:10
 "Brown's Town" (Dorham) – 6:23
 "In 'N Out" [Alternate Take] – 9:15 Bonus track on CD reissue

Personnel
Joe Henderson — tenor saxophone
Kenny Dorham — trumpet
McCoy Tyner — piano
Richard Davis — bass
Elvin Jones — drums

References

1965 albums
Blue Note Records albums
Joe Henderson albums
Albums produced by Alfred Lion
Albums recorded at Van Gelder Studio